Beau Dommage is the self-titled debut album by Quebec folk-rock group Beau Dommage, released in 1974. It is their most popular album, making triple platinum with many hit singles such as Le picbois, Tous les palmiers, and La complainte du phoque en Alaska.

Track listing
All tracks written by Robert Léger except where noted.

Side One
"Tous les palmiers" – 3:20
"À toutes les fois" – 4:14
"Chinatown" (written by Michel Rivard) – 3:05
"La complainte du phoque en Alaska" (written by Michel Rivard) – 5:15
"Le picbois" (written by Robert Léger, Michel Rivard, and Pierre Bertrand) – 3:25

Side Two
"Harmonie du soir à Châteauguay" – 3:06
"Le Géant Beaupré" (written by Pierre Huet) – 4:02
"Ginette" (written by Pierre Huet and Michel Rivard) – 2:35
"Un ange gardien" (written by Pierre Huet and Michel Rivard) – 2:56
"23 décembre" (written by Pierre Huet and Michel Rivard) – 2:14
"Montréal" (written by Pierre Huet and Robert Léger) – 4:44

Personnel

Band
Pierre Bertrand – vocals, acoustic guitar, keyboards,
Marie-Michèle Desrosiers – vocals, synthesiser
Réal Desrosiers – drums
Robert Léger – piano, synthesiser, flute, bass
Michel Rivard – vocals, acoustic guitar, electric guitar

Production
 Michel Lachance – producer / mixer
 Pierre Dubord – art director
 Pierre Guimond – makeup and photography

1974 debut albums
Beau Dommage albums
Capitol Records albums